The legislature of the U.S. state of Alaska has convened 32 times since statehood became effective on January 3, 1959.

Legislatures

See also
 List of governors of Alaska
 List of speakers of the Alaska House of Representatives
 Alaska Legislature
 Alaska Senate
 Alaska
 Government of Alaska

References
 
 

 
Legislatures
alaska
alaska